Paolo Pino (1534–1565) was an Italian painter and art writer.  He was born in Venice.  A student of Giovanni Gerolamo Savoldo, he wrote the "Dialogo di pittura" (1548), which affirmed the supremacy of the Venetian School over the Florentine School and anticipated some aspects of the Mannerist style.

Works 
Writings

Paintings
Portrait of a collector, Musée des Beaux-Arts, Chambéry, France.
 Portrait of Doctor Coignati, 1534, Uffizi

Sources
Bibl. : Gilbert Creighton, « Antique Framework for Renaissance Art Theory : Alberti and Pino », Marsyas 3 (1946).

1534 births
1565 deaths
16th-century Italian painters
Italian male painters
Painters from Venice
Italian male non-fiction writers
Italian art historians
Artist authors